The Table Tennis at the 1983 Southeast Asian Games was held between 30 May to 5 June at HDB Club, Toa Payoh.

Medal summary

Medal table

References
 https://eresources.nlb.gov.sg/newspapers/Digitised/Article/straitstimes19830602-1.2.102
 https://eresources.nlb.gov.sg/newspapers/Digitised/Article/straitstimes19830603-1.2.129
 https://eresources.nlb.gov.sg/newspapers/Digitised/Article/straitstimes19830605-1.2.78.27

1983
Southeast Asian Games
1983 Southeast Asian Games events
Table tennis competitions in Singapore